Cardinal Spellman High School is a private college preparatory high school of Catholic denomination established in 1958 and located in Brockton, Massachusetts, United States. Like the school's fellow Catholic school and sports rival, Archbishop Williams High School, Spellman separated from the Boston Archdiocese in the wake of the child sex abuse scandal. The school is named after Cardinal Francis Spellman.

History

Richard Cardinal Cushing, Archbishop of Boston, officiated at the dedication of Cardinal Spellman High School on October 20, 1958. He blessed its buildings and laid the cornerstone during the ceremony. The school was named in honor of Francis Cardinal Spellman, whose birthplace was in the neighboring town of Whitman, Massachusetts. "Sequere Deum - Follow God" was taken from Francis Cardinal Spellman's coat of arms and used as the school's motto.

In September 1958, 300 students began their school careers as students at Cardinal Spellman with Sister M. Vera, CSJ as the founding Principal and a faculty of ten Sisters of Saint Joseph of Boston. Many Sisters worked at Cardinal Spellman over the years. There are no longer any Sisters of Saint Joseph currently working at Spellman. The last one, Sr. Patricia Lynch, left in July 2012.

On December 6, 1963, Cardinal Spellman High School, along with several other secondary schools in the Archdiocese of Boston, was incorporated as a member of the Archdiocesan Central High Schools, Inc. In 1979, the New England Association of Schools and Colleges awarded Cardinal Spellman High School its initial accreditation; in 1989 and again in 1999, the school was re-accredited for successive ten-year periods. Cardinal Spellman High School was elected as a permanent member of the College Board in 1983. The school is also affiliated with the National Catholic Educational Association.

Cardinal Spellman High School was incorporated in January 2004 after the Board of Trustees of the Archdiocesan Central High Schools, Inc., determined that each of its schools would be best served by becoming an independent public juridic institution governed by its own Board of Trustees. Beginning on September 1, 2004, Spellman's Board of Trustees took over the responsibility of governing the school.

Sexual abuse incident
In 2016, The Boston Globe reported that, seven years prior, a Spanish teacher began a sexual relationship with his seventeen-year-old female student. At the time, the student's parents found evidence of the teacher's relationship with their daughter, including a hotel receipt and graphic photos. Spellman fired the teacher after administrators saw the photos. The case brought to light controversy over Massachusetts laws governing age of consent and sexual relationships between teachers and students.

Athletics
Peter Ambrose, a longtime football and baseball coach at Cardinal Spellman, won 628 games in 50 years on the diamond before retiring, making him one of four Massachusetts high school baseball coaches to win 600 games. He also captured 12 Catholic Central League championships and one Eastern Mass. Championship.
Coaching football, he won 211 games in 41 years, as well as 12 league titles and one Super Bowl appearance. He retired in 2010.

The fall season in 2011 was particularly impressive for Cardinals sports teams. Spellman won five Catholic Central titles and had a combined record of 79-15-1.

In 2019, Spellman installed its first artificial turf field on Potvin Field.

Titles

Drama
Spellman is recognized locally for its outstanding drama program. Robert J. McEwan, a longtime teacher at Spellman and chair of the English department for 47 years, established the school's first drama department in 1965, opening the school's first production of The King and I to a full house. McEwan went on to direct 47 musicals and 35 "Spring Shows," annual productions that frequently featured alumni, parents, and teachers as well as students.

Spellman established the Robert J. McEwan Drama Hall of Fame in 1996. Since its inception, it has inducted over 100 alumni, teachers, staff members, parents, and other friends of Spellman, honoring their contributions to the drama program both on and off the stage. Though McEwan died in 2013, his legacy continues through the flourishing drama program that he created. In 2015, the school honored McEwan by dedicating the newly renovated auditorium foyer in his name.

Notable alumni
John Altieri – singer and stage actor
Paul Antonelli – composer and music director
Suzanne M. Bump – current Massachusetts State Auditor and former State Representative and state Secretary of Labor
Jane Condon – comedian, winner of Last Comic Standing
Hon. Mark Gildea – Massachusetts Superior Court Justice
Christine Hurley – comedian
Thomas P. Kennedy – former Massachusetts State Representative and State Senator
John E. Walsh – former Chairman of the Massachusetts Democratic Party

References

External links 
 Official site

Schools in Plymouth County, Massachusetts
Catholic secondary schools in Massachusetts
Educational institutions established in 1958
1958 establishments in Massachusetts